Thanksgiving is a national holiday celebrated on various dates in the United States, Canada, Grenada, Saint Lucia, Liberia, and unofficially in countries like Brazil and Philippines. It is also observed in the Dutch town of Leiden and the Australian territory of Norfolk Island. It began as a day of giving thanks for the blessings of the harvest and of the preceding year. (Similarly named harvest festival holidays occur throughout the world during autumn, including in Germany and Japan). Thanksgiving is celebrated on the second Monday of October in Canada and on the fourth Thursday of November in the United States and around the same part of the year in other places. Although Thanksgiving has historical roots in religious and cultural traditions, it has long been celebrated as a secular holiday as well.

History
Prayers of thanks and special thanksgiving ceremonies are common among most religions after harvests and at other times of the year. The Thanksgiving holiday's history in North America is rooted in English traditions dating from the Protestant Reformation. It also has aspects of a harvest festival, even though the harvest in New England occurs well before the late-November date on which the modern Thanksgiving holiday is celebrated.

In the English tradition, days of thanksgiving and special thanksgiving religious services became important during the English Reformation in the reign of Henry VIII. Before 1536 there were 95 Church holidays, plus 52 Sundays, when people were required to attend church and forego work. Though the 1536 reforms in the Church of England reduced the number of holidays in the liturgical calendar to 27, the Puritan party in the Anglican Church wished to eliminate all Church holidays apart from the weekly Lord's Day, including the evangelical feasts of Christmas and Easter (cf. Puritan Sabbatarianism). The holidays were to be replaced by specially called Days of Fasting and Days of Thanksgiving, in response to events that the Puritans viewed as acts of special providence. Unexpected disasters or threats of judgement from on high called for Days of Fasting.

Special blessings, viewed as coming from God, called for Days of Thanksgiving, which were observed through Christian church services and other gatherings. For example, Days of thanksgiving were called following the victory over the Spanish Armada in 1588 and following the deliverance of Queen Anne in 1605. An unusual annual Day of Thanksgiving began in 1606 following the failure of the Gunpowder Plot in 1605 and developed into Guy Fawkes Day on November 5. Days of Fasting were called on account of plagues in 1604 and 1622, drought in 1611, and floods in 1613. Annual Thanksgiving prayers were dictated by the charter of English settlers upon their safe landing in America in 1619 at Berkeley Hundred in Virginia.

In Canada

According to some historians, the first celebration of Thanksgiving in North America occurred during the 1578 voyage of Martin Frobisher from England in search of the Northwest Passage. Other researchers, however, state that "there is no compelling narrative of the origins of the Canadian Thanksgiving day."

Antecedents for Canadian Thanksgiving are also sometimes traced to the French settlers who came to New France in the 17th century, who celebrated their successful harvests. The French settlers in the area typically had feasts at the end of the harvest season. They continued throughout the winter season, even sharing food with the indigenous peoples of the area.

As settlers arrived in Nova Scotia from New England after 1700, late autumn Thanksgiving celebrations became commonplace. New immigrants into the country—such as the Irish, Scottish, and Germans—also added their own traditions to the harvest celebrations. Most of the U.S. aspects of Thanksgiving (such as the turkey) were incorporated when United Empire Loyalists began to flee from the United States during and after the American Revolution and settled in Canada.

In 1859, the government of the Provinces of Canada declared a Thanksgiving Day in which "all Canadians [were asked] to spend the holiday in 'public and solemn' recognition of God's mercies." On 9 October 1879, Canada's Governor General, the Marquis of Lorne, declared November 6 as "a day of General Thanksgiving to Almighty God for the bountiful harvest with which Canada has been blessed." The Canadian Parliament on 31 January 1957 applied the same language in its proclamation for the modern holiday: "A Day of General Thanksgiving to Almighty God for the bountiful harvest with which Canada has been blessed—to be observed on the second Monday in October."

In the United States

 
The annual Thanksgiving holiday tradition in the United States is documented for the first time in 1619, in what is now called the Commonwealth of Virginia. Thirty-eight English settlers aboard the ship Margaret arrived by way of the James River at Berkeley Hundred in Charles City County, Virginia on December 4, 1619. The landing was immediately followed by a religious celebration, specifically dictated by the group's charter from the London Company. The charter declared, "that the day of our ships arrival at the place assigned for plantation in the land of Virginia shall be yearly and perpetually kept holy as a day of thanksgiving to Almighty God." Since the mid 20th century, the original celebration has been commemorated there annually at present-day Berkeley Plantation, ancestral home of the Harrison family of Virginia.

The more familiar Thanksgiving precedent is traced to the Pilgrims and Puritans who emigrated from England in the 1620s and 1630s.  They brought their previous 
tradition of Days of Fasting and Days of Thanksgiving with them to New England. The 1621 Plymouth, Massachusetts thanksgiving was prompted by a good harvest. The Pilgrims celebrated this with the Wampanoags, a tribe of Native Americans who, along with the last surviving Patuxet, had helped them get through the previous winter by giving them food in that time of scarcity, in exchange for an alliance and protection against the rival Narragansett tribe.

Several days of Thanksgiving were held in early New England history that have been identified as the "First Thanksgiving", including Pilgrim holidays in Plymouth in 1621 and 1623, and a Puritan holiday in Boston in 1631. According to historian Jeremy Bangs, director of the Leiden American Pilgrim Museum, the Pilgrims may have been influenced by watching the annual services of Thanksgiving for the relief of the siege of Leiden in 1574, while they were staying in Leiden. Now called 3 Oktoberfeest, Leiden's autumn thanksgiving celebration in 1617 was the occasion for sectarian disturbance that appears to have accelerated the pilgrims' plans to emigrate to America.

Later in New England, religious thanksgiving services were declared by civil leaders such as Governor Bradford, who planned the Plymouth colony's thanksgiving celebration and feast in 1623. Bradford issued a proclamation of Thanksgiving following victory in the Pequot War in the late 1630s to celebrate "the bloody victory, thanking God that the battle had been won." The practice of holding an annual harvest festival did not become a regular affair in New England until the late 1660s.

Thanksgiving proclamations were made mostly by church leaders in New England up until 1682, and then by both state and church leaders until after the American Revolution. During the revolutionary period, political influences affected the issuance of Thanksgiving proclamations. Various proclamations were made by royal governors, and conversely by patriot leaders, such as John Hancock, General George Washington, and the Continental Congress, each giving thanks to God for events favorable to their causes. As President of the United States, George Washington proclaimed the first nationwide thanksgiving celebration in America marking November 26, 1789, "as a day of public thanksgiving and prayer, to be observed by acknowledging with grateful hearts the many and signal favours of Almighty God", and calling on Americans to "unite in most humbly offering our prayers and supplications to the great Lord and Ruler of Nations and beseech him to pardon our national and other transgressions."

Debate over first celebrations

Devotees in New England and Virginia and other places have maintained contradictory claims to having held the first Thanksgiving celebration in what became the United States. The question is complicated by the concept of Thanksgiving as either a holiday celebration or a religious service. James Baker maintains, "The American holiday's true origin was the New England Calvinist Thanksgiving. Never coupled with a Sabbath meeting, the Puritan observances were special days set aside during the week for thanksgiving and praise in response to God's providence." Baker calls the debate a "tempest in a beanpot" and "marvelous nonsense" based on regional claims.

In 1963, President John F. Kennedy acknowledged both the Virginia and Massachusetts claims. Kennedy issued Proclamation 3560 on November 5, 1963, stating, "Over three centuries ago, our forefathers in Virginia and in Massachusetts, far from home in a lonely wilderness, set aside a time of thanksgiving. On the appointed day, they gave reverent thanks for their safety, for the health of their children, for the fertility of their fields, for the love which bound them together, and for the faith which united them with their God."

Other claims include an earlier religious service by Spanish explorers in Texas at San Elizario in 1598. Historians Robyn Gioia and Michael Gannon of the University of Florida argue that the earliest Thanksgiving service in what is now the United States was celebrated by the Spanish community on September 8, 1565, in current Saint Augustine, Florida.

Fixing a date

Canada
The earlier Thanksgiving celebrations in Canada has been attributed to the earlier onset of winter in the North, thus ending the harvest season earlier. Thanksgiving in Canada did not have a fixed date until the late 19th century. Prior to Canadian Confederation, many of the individual colonial governors of the Canadian provinces had declared their own days of Thanksgiving. The first official Canadian Thanksgiving occurred on April 15, 1872, when the nation was celebrating the Prince of Wales' recovery from a serious illness.

By the end of the 19th century, Thanksgiving Day was normally celebrated on November 6. In the late 19th century, the Militia staged "sham battles" for public entertainment on Thanksgiving Day. The Militia agitated for an earlier date for the holiday, so they could use the warmer weather to draw bigger crowds. However, when the First World War ended, the Armistice Day holiday was usually held during the same week. To prevent the two holidays from clashing with one another, in 1957 the Canadian Parliament proclaimed Thanksgiving to be observed on its present date on the second Monday of October.

United States
Thanksgiving in the United States has been observed on differing dates. From the time of the Founding Fathers until the time of Lincoln, the date of observance varied from state to state. The final Thursday in November had become the customary date in most U.S. states by the beginning of the 19th century, coinciding with, and eventually superseding the holiday of Evacuation Day (commemorating the day the British exited the United States after the Revolutionary War). Modern Thanksgiving was proclaimed for all states in 1863 by Abraham Lincoln. Influenced by Sarah Josepha Hale, who wrote letters to politicians for approximately 40 years advocating an official holiday, Lincoln set national Thanksgiving by proclamation for the final Thursday in November in celebration of the bounties that had continued to fall on the Union and for the military successes in the war, also calling on the American people, "with humble penitence for our national perverseness and disobedience .. fervently implore the interposition of the Almighty hand to heal the wounds of the nation..." Because of the ongoing Civil War, a nationwide Thanksgiving celebration was not realized until Reconstruction was completed in the 1870s.

On October 31, 1939, President Franklin D. Roosevelt signed a presidential proclamation changing the holiday to the next to last Thursday in November in an effort to boost the economy. The earlier date created an extra seven days for Christmas shopping since at that time retailers never began promoting the Christmas season until after Thanksgiving. But making the proclamation so close to the change wreaked havoc on the holiday schedules of many people, schools, and businesses, and most Americans were not in favor of the change. Some of those who opposed dubbed the holiday "Franksgiving" that year. Some state governors went along with the change while others stuck with the original November 30 date for the holiday, and three states — Colorado, Mississippi, and Texas — observed both dates. The double Thanksgiving continued for two more years, and then on December 26, 1941, Roosevelt signed a joint resolution of Congress changing the official national Thanksgiving Day to the fourth Thursday in November starting in 1942.

Since 1971, when the American Uniform Monday Holiday Act took effect, the American observance of Columbus Day has coincided with the Canadian observance of Thanksgiving.

Observance

Australia
In the Australian external territory of Norfolk Island, Thanksgiving is celebrated on the last Wednesday of November, similar to the pre–World War II American observance on the last Thursday of the month. This means the Norfolk Island observance is the day before or six days after the United States' observance. The holiday was brought to the island by visiting American whaling ships.

Brazil 
In Brazil, National Thanksgiving Day was instituted by President Gaspar Dutra, through Law 781 of August 17, 1949, at the suggestion of Ambassador Joaquim Nabuco, who was enthusiastic about the commemorations he saw in 1909 in St. Patrick's Cathedral as an ambassador in Washington. In 1966, Law 5110 established that the Thanksgiving celebration would take place on the fourth Thursday of November. This date is celebrated by many families of American origin, by some Protestant Christian denominations, such as the Evangelical Lutheran Church of Brazil (which is of American origin), the Presbyterian Church, the Baptist Church, the Methodist Church, and the Church of the Nazarene, and Methodist denominational universities. The day is also celebrated by evangelical churches such as the Foursquare Gospel Church in Brazil.

Canada

Thanksgiving, occurring on the second Monday in October, is an annual Canadian holiday to give thanks at the close of the harvest season. Although the original act of Parliament references God and the holiday is celebrated in churches, the holiday is mostly celebrated in a secular manner. Thanksgiving is a statutory holiday in all provinces in Canada, except for New Brunswick and Nova Scotia. While businesses may remain open in these provinces, the holiday is nonetheless recognized and celebrated regardless of its status.

Grenada
In the West Indian island of Grenada, in the Caribbean, there is a national holiday known as Thanksgiving Day which is celebrated on October 25. Even though it bears the same name, and is celebrated at roughly the same time as the American and Canadian versions of Thanksgiving, this holiday is unrelated to either of those celebrations. Instead, the holiday marks the anniversary of the U.S.-led invasion of the island in 1983, in response to the deposition and execution of the socialist Grenadian Prime Minister Maurice Bishop by a military government from within his own party.

Liberia
In the West African country of Liberia, Thanksgiving is celebrated on the first Thursday of November. In 1883, the Legislature of Liberia enacted a statute declaring this day as a national holiday. Thanksgiving is celebrated in the country in large part due to the nation's founding as a colony of the American Colonization Society in 1821 by former slaves and free people of color from the United States. However, the Liberian  celebration of the holiday is notably different from the American celebration. While some Liberian families chose to celebrate with a feast or cook out, it is not considered a staple of the holiday and there is no specific food heavily associated with Thanksgiving. Some chose to celebrate the holiday by attending religious ceremonies, while others take it as a day for relaxation. Others view the holiday as an imposition from the American settlers of the country. In the years following the second civil war, some Liberians have taken the holiday as a time to be thankful for this new period peace and relative stability.

Netherlands

Many of the Pilgrims who migrated to the Plymouth Plantation resided in the city of Leiden from 1609 to 1620 and had recorded their births, marriages, and deaths at the Pieterskerk (St. Peter's church). In commemoration, a non-denominational Thanksgiving Day service is held each year on the morning of the American Thanksgiving Day in the Pieterskerk, a Gothic church in Leiden, noting the hospitality the Pilgrims received in Leiden on their way to the New World.

Thanksgiving is observed by orthodox Protestant churches in the Netherlands on the first Wednesday in November. It is not a public holiday. Those who observe the day either go to church in the evening or take the day off and go to church in the morning (and occasionally afternoon) too.

Philippines
The Philippines, while it was an American colony in the first half of the 20th century, celebrated Thanksgiving as a special public holiday on the same day as the Americans. During the Japanese occupation during World War II, both the Americans and Filipinos celebrated Thanksgiving in secret. After Japanese withdrawal in 1945, the tradition continued until 1969. It was revived by President Ferdinand Marcos, but the date was changed to be on every September 21, when martial law was imposed in the country. After Marcos' ouster in 1986, the tradition was no longer continued, due to the controversial events that occurred during his long administration.

As of 2022, Thanksgiving has been revived as a commercial and cultural holiday, albeit stripped of its official status. SM Supermalls led the way in the slow revival of Thanksgiving Day on the same day as in the U.S., as in the old days. Many malls and hotels offer special sales on this day, which is part of the long celebration of Christmas in the Philippines, which begins in September (unlike on Black Friday in the United States).

Rwanda

Called Umuganura Day, this is a Thanksgiving festival to mark the start of the harvest in Rwanda. It is celebrated on the first Friday of August.

Saint Lucia
The nation of Saint Lucia celebrates Thanksgiving on the first Monday in October.

United States

Thanksgiving, celebrated on the fourth Thursday in November since 1941 due to federal legislation, has been an annual tradition in the United States by presidential proclamation since 1863 and by state legislation since the Founding Fathers of the United States. Traditionally, Thanksgiving has been a celebration of the blessings of the year, including the harvest. On Thanksgiving Day, it is common for Americans to share a family meal, attend church services, and view special sporting events. In addition, Thanksgiving is celebrated in public places with parades such as Macy's Thanksgiving Parade in New York City, ABC Dunkin' Donuts Thanksgiving Day Parade in Philadelphia, America's Hometown Thanksgiving Parade in Plymouth, Massachusetts, McDonald's Thanksgiving Parade in Chicago, and Bayou Classic Thanksgiving Parade in New Orleans. What Americans call the "Holiday Season" generally begins with Thanksgiving. The first day after Thanksgiving Day—Black Friday—marks the start of the Christmas shopping season.

Thanksgiving is usually celebrated with a family meal. Beginning in the 2010s, a new tradition has emerged to also celebrate Thanksgiving with a meal with friends, as a separate event on a different day or an alternate event on Thanksgiving day. This is referred to as Friendsgiving.

Similarly named holidays

Germany

The Harvest Thanksgiving Festival, Erntedankfest, is a popular German Christian festival on the first Sunday of October. The festival has a significant religious component, and many churches are decorated with autumn crops. In some places, there are religious processions or parades. Many Bavarian beer festivals, like the Munich Oktoberfest, take place within the vicinity of Erntedankfest.

Japan

 is a national holiday in Japan. It takes place annually on November 23. The law establishing the holiday, which was adopted during the American occupation after World War II, cites it as an occasion for commemorating labor and production and giving each other thanks. It has roots in the ancient Shinto harvest ceremony.

United Kingdom

The Harvest Festival of Thanksgiving does not have an official date in the United Kingdom; however, it is traditionally held on or near the Sunday of the harvest moon that occurs closest to the autumnal equinox. Harvest Thanksgiving in Britain also has pre-Christian roots when the Saxons would offer the first sheaf of barley, oats, or wheat to fertility gods. When the harvest was finally collected, communities would come together for a harvest supper. When Christianity arrived in Britain many traditions remained, and today the Harvest Festival is marked by churches and schools in late September/early October (same as Canada) with singing, praying and decorating with baskets of food and fruit to celebrate a successful harvest and to give thanks. Collections of food are usually held which are then given to local charities which help the homeless and those in need.

See also

 Cyber Monday
 List of harvest festivals
 List of films set around Thanksgiving
 Thanksgiving Parade

References

Sources

External links

Agriculture in society
Autumn festivals
Food and drink appreciation
Harvest festivals
Holidays and observances by scheduling (nth weekday of the month)
Monday observances
November observances
October observances
 
Types of secular holidays